Rodomonte's Revenge (later retitled Video Trap) is the second novel in the World of Adventure series by Gary Paulsen. It was later retitled Video Trap by Macmillan Children's Books in the UK and released on July 9, 1999.

Plot
It features Brett and Tom who are playing the new virtual reality game, Rodomonte's Revenge, but when the computer infiltrates their minds the game transforms into something dangerously real. It was published on November 1, 1994 by Yearling.

Novels by Gary Paulsen
1994 American novels
American young adult novels
Children's science fiction novels
1994  children's books